Carl Tuttle (born December 26, 1953, in Natick, Massachusetts) is an American Christian singer-songwriter and hymnist.

His compositions include Hosanna, Hosanna, Hosannna to The King of Kings and Open Your Eyes, See The Glory of The King, both of which are included in many modern hymnaries. Hosanna, for example, appears in the Australian Hymn Book second edition Together in Song, in the Baptist Hymnal 2008 and was chosen as one of the top 100 worship songs by Lindsay Terry.

Tuttle learned to play the guitar and became an accomplished singer while at high school. In 1965 he became involved in a Christian group that included John Wimber. Influenced by Ralph Carmichael, he began writing songs. In 1976 he became worship leader at the church that met in his sister's home in Yorba Linda, California. He subsequently joined the worship team at Vineyard Christian Fellowship, Anaheim, then led by Wimber; they often collaborated in songwriting. He was the senior pastor at the Anaheim Vineyard between 1994 and 1997. His autobiography is "Reckless Mercy: A Trophy of God's Grace" (2017).

References

1953 births
Living people
American performers of Christian music
Singer-songwriters from Massachusetts
People from Natick, Massachusetts